This is a list of educational institutions in the district of Rawalpindi, Pakistan.

Universities

Colleges

References

Universities and colleges in Rawalpindi District
Rawalpindi
Rawalpindi
Schools in Rawalpindi